So What Now? is a British television sitcom which aired on BBC One. It was created by Lee Evans, who also starred in the series. Evans co-wrote the show alongside Stuart Silver and Peter Tilbury. The series was broadcast from 26 March 2001 to 22 May 2001.

Plot
The series centres around Lee sharing a house with his slobbish best friend and their neurotic landlady.

Cast and characters

Main
 Lee Evans, as Lee Evans, a barely employed musician and everything he touches seems to turn to disaster. He does write tunes for mobile phone ringtones and has a son, Lucas, with his now estranged wife, Eileen.
 Steven O'Donnell as Stuart Ponder, Lee's slobbish and disorganised best friend. He allows Lee to stay in his flat against his better judgement and soon regrets his decision. He is a double glazing window salesman and was married to Wendy and had children with her.
 Sophie Thompson as Heather Ollerenshaw, Lee and Stuart's fiercely neurotic landlady. She appears desperate to find a man, while also being a failed "IT" girl. Her father is in prison for embezzlement.

Episodes

DVD release
The series was made available on DVD on 12 November 2001 in a two-disc set, with bonus features including 30 minutes of outtakes and a documentary on Lee Evans.

References

External links

Lee Evans Interview at Times Online

2001 British television series debuts
2001 British television series endings
BBC television sitcoms
English-language television shows